Dmitri Vladimirovich Borodin (born 8 October 1977) is a Russian former professional footballer who played as a goalkeeper. He works as the goalkeeper coach with PFC Sochi.

Club career
Born in Leningrad (now Saint Petersburg), Soviet Union, Dimitri Borodin began playing in the junior squad for Lokomotiv Saint Petersburg in 1998. After establishing himself, he transferred to FC Zenit Saint Petersburg where he was a reserve goalkeeper behind Roman Berezovsky and Vyacheslav Malafeev.

In 2002, Borodin transferred to FC Torpedo Moscow and quickly established himself as the first choice goalkeeper (in 2003–04 UEFA Cup series against PFC CSKA Sofia, he saved three penalty shots in the deciding shootout, taking Torpedo to the second round). However, by 2007, Borodin became the third reserve goalkeeper behind Ilya Madilov and Maksim Kabanov.

After his career with Torpedo, Borodin had a brief stint with FC Sibir Novosibirsk during the spring of 2008 before transferring to FC Anzhi Makhachkala. On 25 February 2009, FC Zenit Saint Petersburg signed the goalkeeper, who already played for Zenit in 2001, to a four-year contract. In 2009, he was loaned out to FC Khimki and in August, he returned to Zenit.

International career
Dmitri Borodin was called up to the Russia national team but did not make a debut.

Career statistics

References

External links
 eurosport profile

1977 births
Living people
Russian footballers
Association football goalkeepers
FC Zenit Saint Petersburg players
FC Torpedo Moscow players
FC Anzhi Makhachkala players
FC Khimki players
FC Sibir Novosibirsk players
Footballers from Saint Petersburg
Russian Premier League players
FC Lokomotiv Saint Petersburg players